Through the Years is Cilla Black's fourteenth solo studio album, released in 1993. It features cover versions, re-recordings of some of her best known songs, duets with other singers and new songs.

The album peaked at no.41 in the UK Albums Chart, and was Black's first studio album to appear in the charts since Sweet Inspiration in 1970, which had eventually climbed to no.42.

Singles
Three singles were released from the album; the title track, "Through the Years", which reached #54 in the UK Singles Chart, "Heart and Soul", a duet with Dusty Springfield which reached #75, "You'll Never Walk Alone" a duet with Barry Manilow, Streets Of London and Will You Love Me Tomorrow.

Track listing
 "Through the Years" (Charlie Skarbek, Rick Blaskey)
 "That's What Friends Are For" (Duet with Cliff Richard) (Burt Bacharach, Carole Bayer Sager)
 "Here, There and Everywhere" (John Lennon, Paul McCartney)
 "Heart and Soul" (Duet with Dusty Springfield) (Charlie Skarbek, Rick Blaskey)
 "Anyone Who Had a Heart" (Burt Bacharach, Hal David)
 "A Dream Come True" (Peter van Asten, Richard de Bois)
 "You'll Never Walk Alone" (Duet with Barry Manilow) (Richard Rodgers, Oscar Hammerstein II)
 "Streets of London" (Ralph McTell)
 "You're My World (Il Mio Mondo)" (Umberto Bindi, Gino Paoli, Carl Sigman)
 "From a Distance" (Julie Gold)
 "Will You Love Me Tomorrow?" (Gerry Goffin, Carole King)
 "Through the Years" (Reprise) (Charlie Skarbek, Rick Blaskey)

Credits
Personnel
 Lead vocals by Cilla Black
 Produced by Charlie Skarbek
 Executive producer: Rick Blaskey
 Engineered by Pat Stapley, Mark Chamberlain and Charlie Skarbek
 All keyboards and programming by Charlie Skarbek
 Orchestral arrangements by Richard Niles
 Backing vocal arrangements by Tessa Niles
 Cilla Black's musical director: Trevor Brown
 Album cover photograph by John Swannell

References

External links
 CillaBlack.com Discography – Through the Years
 Cilla Black – Through the Years (1993) album releases & credits at Discogs
 Cilla Black – Through the Years (1993) album to be listened as stream on Spotify

Further reading
 

1993 albums
Cilla Black albums